Events from the year 1950 in South Korea.

Incumbents
President: Rhee Syng-man 
Vice President: Yi Si-yeong
Prime Minister: 
 until 21 April: Yi Pom-sok 
 21 April–23 November: Shin Song-mo 
 starting 23 November: Chang Myon

Events
 Korean War

Births

21 August – Seok Cheoljoo.

Deaths

6 October – Seok Cheoljoo.

See also
List of South Korean films of 1950
Years in Japan
Years in North Korea

References

 
South Korea
Years of the 20th century in South Korea
South Korea
1950s in South Korea